The Turkey men's national artistic gymnastics team represents Turkey in FIG international competitions.

History
Aleko Mulos was the first ever Turkish man to compete at the Olympic Games, doing so in 1908.  Turkey has yet to field a team at the Olympics but had individual athletes compete at the 2016 and 2020 Olympic Games.  At the 2020 Olympic Games Ferhat Arıcan became the first Turkish male gymnast to win an Olympic medal, earning bronze on the parallel bars.

Current senior roster

Team competition results

World Championships
 2014 – 25th place (did not qualify for team final)
 Ferhat Arıcan, Abdulkadir Bas, Coşkun Boncuk, İbrahim Çolak, Ahmet Önder, Ümit Şamiloğlu
 2018 – 15th place (did not qualify for team final)
 Mustafa Arca, Ferhat Arıcan, İbrahim Çolak, Ahmet Önder, Ümit Şamiloğlu
 2019 – 15th place (did not qualify for team final)
 Mustafa Arca, Ferhat Arıcan, İbrahim Çolak, Yunus Gündoğdu, Ahmet Önder
 2022 – 11th place (did not qualify for team final)
 Ferhat Arıcan, Adem Asil, Yunus Gündoğdu, Mehmet Koşak, Ahmet Önder

Junior World Championships
 2019 — 16th place
 Emre Dodanli, Kerem Şener, Bora Tarhan

Most decorated gymnasts
This list includes all Turkish male artistic gymnasts who have won a medal at the Olympic Games or the World Artistic Gymnastics Championships.

See also 
 Turkey women's national artistic gymnastics team
 List of Olympic male artistic gymnasts for Turkey

References 

Gymnastics in Turkey
National men's artistic gymnastics teams
Gymnastics